The Bat Conservation Trust (BCT) is a registered British charity dedicated to the conservation of bats and their habitats in the UK. BCT was founded in 1991 and is the only national organisation solely devoted to bats. Its vision is a world where bats and people live in harmony. BCT currently has a membership of around 5,600, including individuals, families, teachers and youth workers and corporate businesses.

BCT’s work is based on four key objectives, which are seen as critical to maintaining a sustainable, diverse bat population in the UK: 
 To determine target population levels and associated habitats
 To secure and maintain the stated target bat population levels
 To act as the authoritative voice for bat conservation
 To win the required level of support to achieve the target number of bats.

National Bat Helpline 
BCT runs the National Bat Helpline, providing information to anyone needing advice on issues relating to bats, and connecting people with local bat carers and volunteers if necessary. The helpline received over 13,000 enquiries in 2013.  Users can telephone the helpline directly (on 0345 1300 228, with hours varying by season) or submit queries via a form on BCT's website.

National Bat Monitoring Programme 
The National Bat Monitoring Programme (NBMP) was launched in 1996 and consists of a number of national, annual surveys carried out by a network of volunteers across the UK. The NBMP is a partnership between Bat Conservation Trust (BCT), Joint Nature Conservation Committee (JNCC), Defra and Natural Resources Wales (NRW). Natural England (NE) also contribute to the programme.

BCT runs NBMP surveys aimed at beginners as well as experts, and their current surveys include the Sunset/Sunrise survey, Field Survey, Waterway Survey, Roost Count, Hibernation Survey, Woodland Survey and Nathusius’ Pipistrelle Survey. The results from these surveys are compiled into an annual report, available to view on the BCT website. Currently, statistically robust trends are produced for 11 of the UK’s 17 breeding species.

NBMP data support and inform conservation action and key government biodiversity and monitoring and reporting including UK and country biodiversity strategies, the Habitats Directive  and the UN Eurobats agreement. NBMP data from selected species are used to produce one of the annual UK Biodiversity Indicators, high-level measures which are used to report on progress towards meeting goals and targets for the conservation of biological diversity.

Nathusius' pipistrelle Bat Survey 
In 2009, as part of the National Bat Monitoring Programme, BCT began the first systematic UK-wide survey of Nathusius’ pipistrelles in order to improve knowledge of the distribution of this species. Nathusius’ pipistrelle is considered to be rare in the UK but is widespread and may be under-recorded in some areas. As this species is often found at large water bodies, particularly during the autumn migration period, the survey involves surveying lakes twice during September, and making audio recordings from broadband bat detectors in order to verify Nathusius’ pipistrelle calls through sonogram analysis.

Although data gained from the survey are still quite limited, there are indications that Nathusius' pipistrelle may be relatively widespread across lakes in some regions in the autumn. From results up to 2013 Greater London showed the highest percentage of sites with analysed recordings that had verified records (83.3%) followed by North East (69.2%), Northern Ireland (57.1%) and East of England (50%). All other regions had at least three sites with confirmed recordings of Nathusius’ pipistrelle. As of 2013, 192 volunteers have taken part and 230 sites have been surveyed.  BCT encourages its members and volunteers to take part, particularly in areas where there are gaps in survey coverage, and the necessary equipment for the survey can be borrowed from their office.

Bat Crime Investigations Project 
Under the Wildlife and Countryside Act 1981 all UK bat species and their roosts became protected by law. Due to their low reproduction rates and long life-spans, bat populations are particularly vulnerable to a range of threats including bat related crimes. BCT also runs a Bat Crime Investigations Project which aims to;

 Record bat related crimes,
 Provide training and advice for the police, SNCOs and bat workers to ensure incidents are reported and investigated, and that the law is enforced with appropriate prosecutions,
 Educate the groups and sectors that perpetrate bat related crime, and create awareness raising initiatives such as the production of best practice guidelines to improve work practices,
 Improve areas of UK policy to reduce opportunities for ignoring the legislative protection given to bats.

The Bat Crime Investigations Project also aims to uphold the protection for bats as detailed in the Wildlife and Countryside Act 1981, which criminalised the following;

 Deliberately capturing, injuring or killing a bat,
 Intentionally or recklessly disturbing a bat in its roost or deliberately disturbing a group of bats,
 Damaging or destroying a bat roosting place (even if bats are not occupying the roost at the time),
 Possessing or advertising/selling/exchanging a bat (dead or alive) or any part of a bat,
 Intentionally or recklessly obstructing access to a bat roost.

Magazines 
BCT produces two members only magazines; Bat News and The Young Bat Worker. BCT also produces a number of publications sent out to its members and the general public with bat information and advice regarding a number of topics including UK bat species, living with bats and gardening for bats. The BCT email bulletin is sent out every two months with current news stories relating to the organisation and general bat conservation. It has a readership of around 10,000.

Bat News 
The first issue of Bat News was published in September 1984, and the magazine is now published three times a year. Bat News features news, research updates and in-depth features regarding the organization and its work.

The Young Bat Worker 
The Young Bat Worker is BCT's magazine for their Young Batworkers’ Club, specifically for members under 16 years old. It features bat-themed activities, games, stories, competitions and curriculum guidance for teachers and is also published three times a year.

Bat groups 
BCT provides support for over 90 bat groups across the UK. The groups are made up of dedicated volunteers and vary in size, ranging from a few individuals to groups with hundreds of members. Bat groups organise and carry out frontline conservation. The activities each group undertakes will vary but include surveys and monitoring projects, leading bat walks and giving talks, research projects, bat care and rehabilitation. Individual groups run local fundraising events for their group and BCT.

Events, Training and Awards 
BCT runs the annual National Bat Conference which takes place across one weekend in September. The conference programme includes talks, workshops and the presentation of both the Vincent Weir and Pete Guest Awards. BCT also runs a number of training courses throughout the year for both volunteers and professionals.

The Vincent Weir Award 
The Vincent Weir scientific award was first presented at the National Bat Conference in 2010, in honour of the late Vincent Weir. The award is presented annually to a student at a UK-based institution who has made a significant contribution to research on the conservation biology of bats.

The Pete Guest award 
The Pete Guest award was first presented in 2004, replacing the “Outstanding voluntary contribution to bat conservation” award set up in 2002. The award is for individuals who have made an outstanding practical contribution to bat conservation, and is also presented to the winner at the National Bat Conference.

Notes

External links 
 
Bat Conservation Trust helpline information
Local bat groups list by the Bat Conservation Trust

Bat conservation
Bats of Europe
Animal welfare organisations based in the United Kingdom
Nature conservation organisations based in the United Kingdom
Environmental organizations established in 1991
1991 establishments in the United Kingdom
Organisations based in the London Borough of Lambeth